Lesya Vorotnyk is a Ukrainian ballerina.

Biography 
Vorotnyk danced as a member of the corps de ballet, and later as a soloist, with the National Opera of Ukraine. 

She joined the Armed Forces of Ukraine during the Russo-Ukrainian War in March 2022, after the country's opera houses were ordered to close. She enlisted after President Volodymyr Zelenskyy called upon citizens to defend Ukraine against the Russian invasion. A picture of Vorotnyk wearing military gear and holding a Kalashnikov rifle circulated on social media platforms.

References 

Living people
People of the Russo-Ukrainian War
Ukrainian ballerinas
Year of birth missing (living people)